Sennie "Skip" Martin III (born June 25, 1957, in San Francisco, California, U.S.) is an American musician, now based in Las Vegas.  He is a lead vocalist, trumpet player, songwriter and producer who was formerly lead vocalist for Kool & The Gang (1988–2007) and the Dazz Band.  Before those groups he was lead singer for the East Wind Band and then he was lead singer for the Mighty Generation Band. With the Dazz Band he won a Grammy Award for the song “Let It Whip”.

Biography
Martin's love of jazz started at the age of eleven, and he learned trumpet. Later he won “Outstanding Trumpet Soloist” at the Monterey Jazz Festival while in high school. His first solo jazz CD, Miles High features Ronnie Laws, Wayman Tisdale, Al McKay, Rickey Lawson and Bruce Conte.

With Kool & the Gang he achieved  Platinum record and with the Dazz Band he achieved Platinum & Gold records.  In his career he released six consecutive Top 100 albums and two Top 100 singles.  Martin has also received an Honorary Degree of Doctor in Music, Lifetime Achievement Award from the African American Music Association, Living Legend Award from the Black Music Academy.

References

External links
 Official site of Sennie "Skip" Martin 
 Official site of Kool & The Gang 
 Official site of Dazz Band

1957 births
Living people
Singers from San Francisco
American male singer-songwriters
American jazz musicians
Record producers from California
American trumpeters
American male trumpeters
21st-century trumpeters
21st-century American male musicians
American male jazz musicians
American singer-songwriters